His Old Branches is the debut extended play by the Long Island indie rock band The Republic of Wolves. It was originally released on iTunes on December 15, 2009. It has since been released on CD by Vintage Hustle Records on June 18, 2010. The EP was recorded, mixed, and mastered by guitarist/vocalist Gregg Andrew DellaRocca at his home studio.

Track listing
All songs written by Gregg Andrew DellaRocca, Billy Duprey, Mason Maggio, Christian Van Deurs, and Chris Wall.

References

External links
The Republic of Wolves on iTunes

2009 debut EPs
The Republic of Wolves albums